Kinloch Falconer (October 28, 1838 - September 23, 1878) was a newspaper editor, officer in the Confederate Army, lawyer, and the 24th Mississippi Secretary of State.

Biography 
Falconer was born on October 28, 1838. He was the son of Colonel Thomas A. Falconer. He had a brother, Howard, who later became a member of the Mississippi House of Representatives. He graduated from the University of Mississippi in 1860. He worked at his father Thomas Falconer's newspaper the Southern Herald in Holly Springs. Enlisting in the 9th Mississippi as a private, he later became an officer in the Confederate Army in the Civil War. Then, Falconer and his brother Howard set up a law practice in Holly Springs, Mississippi, the town in which they resided. His home was known as White Pillars and a postcard was made of it. A carte-de-visite was made of Falconer around 1867. The University of Mississippi Libraries have a collection of his papers.

Political career 
On November 6, 1877, Falconer was elected as a Democrat to the position of Secretary of State of Mississippi. He assumed the position on January 1, 1878. During the Mississippi yellow fever epidemic of 1878, Falconer returned to Holly Springs to nurse his father and brother. He then buried them after they died of the fever. Soon after, Falconer died of the fever in Holly Springs as well, on September 23, 1878.

References

External links
Findagrave entry

1838 births
1878 deaths
Secretaries of State of Mississippi
Mississippi lawyers
Mississippi Democrats